Supermodel Centroamérica was a reality documentary that features contestants from the participating countries Costa Rica, El Salvador, Guatemala, Honduras, Nicaragua and Panama that are living in a villa in Heredia, Costa Rica and do a variety of model-business-based competitions to determine who will win title Super Model Centroamérica.

The show was hosted by Costa Rican model Leonora Jiménez. Season one premiered in August 2007, and was won by Lisseth Cáceres from Panama. She receives the opportunity to participate in an advertising campaign for the REVER brand of lingerie, also participate with Leonora Jiménez as a model for the Polish brand Tiffi in its print campaign, as well as several awards from our sponsors, such as she will also be the representative of Central America in the renowned Supermodel of the World contest to be held in January 2008 in the city of New York by the renowned FORD MODELS agency.

In its second year, the show became a beauty-pageant style search, where each country had its own model search where all of the national winners got a ticket for the Supermodel of the World contest.

Series summary

Contestants

Call-out order

 The contestant was eliminated
 The contestant won the competition

Results

 The contestant was in danger of elimination
 The contestant was eliminated
 The contestant won photo of the week
 The contestant won the competition

Judges
Kito Rojas
Tony Daza
George Caballero
Dafne Montiel

References

2007 television series debuts
2007 television series endings
Costa Rican television series